Marie Therese Jane Cassidy (born 1955) is a pathologist and academic. From 2004 to 2018 she was State Pathologist of Ireland, the first woman to hold the position. She is Professor of Forensic Medicine at the Royal College of Surgeons of Ireland and Trinity College, Dublin.

Early life and education
Marie Cassidy was born in Rutherglen, Glasgow, Scotland, in 1955. She is the granddaughter of emigrants from Donegal. She lives in London and is married with two children.

Cassidy studied medicine at the University of Glasgow, graduating in January 1978.

Career
She became a member of the Royal College of Pathologists in 1985 and a forensic pathologist the same year, making her the first female full-time forensic pathologist in the United Kingdom.

She held a professorship of forensic medicine at the University of Glasgow before moving to Ireland in 1998 to take up the position of Deputy State Pathologist. She was appointed to the position of State Pathologist in January 2004, succeeding Professor John Harbison to become the first female State Pathologist in Ireland.

She is also Professor of Forensic Medicine at the Royal College of Surgeons of Ireland and Trinity College, Dublin.

Cassidy has also worked as a consultant for the United Nations, helping to identify the remains of victims of war crimes in Bosnia.

Cassidy announced her intended retirement as State Pathologist of Ireland on 7 September 2018.

She has acted as a consultant to the television crime series Taggart. She also advised Irish crime writer Alex Barclay.

A character in the book The Human Body is based on her.

Media career
Since retiring as state pathologist in 2018, Cassidy has fronted series for RTÉ including Dr. Cassidy's Casebook where she revisited some of the most memorable investigations of her career. In August 2022, she took part in the documentary Cold Case Collins, a retrospective look at the assassination of Irish revolutionary, Michael Collins on the hundredth anniversary of his death.

In January 2023, Cassidy will appear on the sixth series of ''Dancing with the Stars Ireland.  She was partnered with Stephen Vincent and was eliminated 2nd overall in week 4, finishing in 10th place.

See also
 List of pathologists

References

1951 births
Living people
Irish pathologists
British pathologists
British forensic scientists
Women forensic scientists
People from Rutherglen
Alumni of the University of Glasgow
Academics of the University of Glasgow
Academics of Trinity College Dublin
People from Glasgow
Irish women scientists
20th-century British women scientists
21st-century British women scientists
Women pathologists
20th-century Irish people
21st-century Irish people